Østerbro (literally, "Eastern Bridge") is one of the 10 official districts of Copenhagen, Denmark. It is located just north of the city centre, outside the old city gate Østerport which, after it was moved around 1700, used to be located close to present-day Østerport Station. From the beginning, Østerbro has been a wealthy district, and it remains one of the most affluent areas in Copenhagen.

Geography
It is bordered by Nørrebro to the west, Hellerup to the north and Øresund to the east.

Landmarks 
 Danish Meteorological Institute
 Den Frie Udstilling
 Gasværket
 Frihavn
 Fælledparken
 Garrison's Cemetery
 Parken, the National Stadium
 Rigshospitalet
 Trianglen (“The Triangle”)
 Østerport Station
 Kastellet
 Nordre Frihavnsgade
 The Little Mermaid

In popular culture 

In the popular children's novel, Number the Stars, Østerbrogade is a road on which the Annemarie and her friends run down but are then stopped by a Nazi soldier.

See also
 Districts of Copenhagen

References

External links

 
Copenhagen city districts